William Arthur Heazell (7 January 1831 - 22 January 1917) FRIBA was an architect based in Nottingham.

History
William Arthur Heazell was born on 7 January 1831, the son of Robert Heazell (1799-1867) and Mary (1809-1872). He was educated at Standard Hill Academy, Nottingham.

He was articled to Messrs Waler of Nottingham in 1846 and later was assistant to Walker and Rawlinson.

He set himself up in practice in Nottingham in 1854, later entering into a partnership with Arthur Ernest Heazell as Heazell and Son. In 1893 he was elected a Fellow of the Royal Institute of British Architects.

He was President of the Nottingham Architectural Society in 1883.

He married Anne Nicholson on 18 June 1861 at Holy Trinity Church, Trinity Square, and they had eight children:
Emily Annie Heazell (1862-1952)
Arthur Ernest Heazell (1863-1941) who later joined him in practice
Francis Nicholson Heazell (1866-1953)
Edward Henry Heazell (1867-1948)
Kate Mary Heazell (1869-1948)
Frederic William Heazell (1871-1945)
Walter Albert Heazell (1873-1959)
Edith May Heazell (1878-1889)

He retired in 1903 and died in 1917 and is buried in the Church (Rock) Cemetery, Mansfield Road, Nottingham.

Works
Holy Trinity Church, Trinity Square Nottingham 1873 (new chancel)
Warehouse for W. Cotton, Weekday Cross, Nottingham 1874-75
St Mark's Church, Nottingham 1875 New chancel
St Stephen's Mission Schools, Charlotte Street/Mount East Street, Nottingham 1875
Simkin's butchers shop, Angel Row, Nottingham 1876
Nottingham Cemetery Chapel, 1876
220 Station Road, Beeston Cottage. 1877-78
Warehouse, 32a, Stoney Street, Nottingham 1885 restored after a fire
St Jude's Church, Mapperley 1892-93  New chancel
1 Houndsgate 1887
Semi-detached houses, 262-264 Queen's Road, Beeston circa 1890
6 Bridlesmith Gate/21 St Peter's Gate, Nottingham, 1895-96
45 Bridlesmith Gate, Nottingham 1896
19 Stoney Street, Nottingham 1898
Semi-detached villas, 429-443 Mansfield Road, Nottingham
Insurance Offices, Upper Parliament Street, Nottingham 1900 (now the Nottingham Building Society)
Church of St Mary the Virgin and All Souls, Bulwell 1900  New Reredos
17 Stoney Street, Nottingham 1901
National Westminster Bank, Radford Road/Gregory Boulevard, Nottingham 1901
Coach and Horses, Upper Parliament Street, Nottingham 1904
St Andrew's Church, Nottingham 1905 porch and vestries
Oriel Chambers, Long Row, Nottingham 1905-06
Letchworth Garden City mission church, 1908 
St Mark's Church, Nottingham 1908  New hall
34-35 Long Row, Nottingham 1910
15 Stoney Street, Nottingham 1910
All Saints’ Church, Stanley Common, Derbyshire 1913 
George Hotel, George Street, Nottingham 1914 remodelling

References

19th-century English architects
20th-century English architects
Architects from Nottingham
People from Nottingham
1831 births
1917 deaths